Geoffrey II (died 1043) was a Frankish archbishop of Bordeaux. He was selected by William V of Aquitaine and Sancho VI of Gascony at Blaye in 1027.

As a Frank, he directed his attention northwards, in the Limousin (1028) and Saintonge (1030). He founded the monastery of Barbezieux in 1037.

References

Sources
Ademar of Chabannes.
Higounet, Charles. Bordeaux pendant le haut moyen age. Bordeaux, 1963.

1043 deaths
11th-century French Roman Catholic bishops
Archbishops of Bordeaux
11th-century archbishops
Year of birth unknown